is a Japanese light novel series written by Kyouhei Iwai and illustrated by Ruroo. There is also a short story series called Mushi-Uta bug that is serialized in The Sneaker magazine. A manga adaptation by Seijuro Miz is serialized in Shōnen Ace magazine. An anime television series adaptation written by Reiko Yoshida and directed by Kazuo Sakai began airing on July 6, 2007.

Plot 

Mushi-Utas story takes place in the near future. Ten years before the story's opening, strange insect-like creatures known as "Mushi" began appearing. The Mushi are able to consume people's dreams and thoughts in return for supernatural powers. At the end of episode one, protagonist Daisuke "Kakkō" Kusuriya encounters a young girl named Shiika Anmoto. The two, in time, become quite close. However, unbeknownst to Kakkō, Shiika is an escapee from a secret prison known as GARDEN where those possessed by the Mushi, known as the Mushitsuki, are held. GARDEN's military force, the Special Environmental Conservation Executive Office, dispatches its finest killer to track down Shiika. However, they are faced with resistance from the Mushibane resistance organisation, led by the secretive "Ladybug".

Characters 

The main protagonist, he is believed by most hosts to be the most powerful among them. Years ago, he shot Shiika's mushi, and promised her to make her dream come true. However, he does not seem to realize that Shiika was the girl he made the promise to. He has a sister named Chiharu, whose whereabouts are currently unknown. His mushi can synchronize with his gun and his body, increase the range and power of the gun and grant him super human strength, speed and durability. It is hinted that the more powerful he makes the bullet, the more his dreams or energy is drained. He has feelings for Shiika and treasures her dearly.

Thought to be one of the most dangerous host. Her mushi, was killed by Daisuke years prior to the main story. After she regained her memories and emotions, she escaped GARDEN, and was found by Daisuke. She now lives in Rina's house and goes by the alias  within Mushibane. Her mushi power is Substance Metamorph (Anything, when they are touched by the snowflakes produced by Shiika’s (Mushi), will not able to keep its original shape. Within the range of snowflakes falling, Shiika had the power of overwhelm and complete destruction) where the mushi shines like a bright ball and is able to cause heavy impacts with high velocity tackles. Furthermore, it can create a snow storm that kills other mushi in it, presumably by high atmospheric pressure. She is stabbed by a mushi and ends up in the hospital. At the end of season 1, Kakkou tells her that "Next Christmas, wait for me at the planetarium. I can't meet you yet, but I will definitely go."

Daisuke's classmate, and the leader of Mushibane. After seeing Shiika, she let her stay in her house. She has a crush on Daisuke, unaware of his true identity or his feelings for Shiika. According to Daisuke, she reminds him of his older sister. She is able to ride Nanahoshi to fly. Her most powerful attack used on a berserk Centi seems to be a highspeed sonic slash. 

Leader of the SEPB branch on Ouka city. His sister lives by eating away his dreams, a fact only known to him and Daisuke.

Haji's ditzy secretary. She mainly serves to lighten the mood when Haji and Kakkō (or other SEPB members) are talking in a serious tone.

A double agent working for both Haji and Mushibane. Her true intention is to defeat Kakkō and take his place as Haji's right hand, whom she is in love with. It also has the ability to shoot small lasers and somehow grants Minmin the power to fly and float. Her mushi is later killed by Shiika's mushi, Fuyuhotaru.

Media

Light novel

Anime

See also
 Unbreakable Machine-Doll, another light novel series illustrated by the same illustrator.
 Oreshura, another light novel series illustrated by the same illustrator.
 Reincarnated as a Sword, another light novel series illustrated by the same illustrator.

References

External links 
 Official Mushi-Uta Website (Japanese)
 

2003 Japanese novels
Animated television series about insects
Fiction about insects
Kadokawa Dwango franchises
Kadokawa Shoten manga
Kadokawa Sneaker Bunko
Light novels
Shōnen manga
Wowow original programming